Glandore (postcode 5037) is a suburb of Adelaide, South Australia, partly in the City of Marion and partly in the City of West Torrens. The name is believed to come from Glandore in County Cork, Ireland, whence the family of John O'Dea, one of the original property owners of the area, came.

History
The City of Marion section of Glandore was originally named Edwardstown.

Edwardstown Industrial School (1898–1949) was renamed Glandore Industrial School until 1958, when it became Glandore Children's Home until its closure in 1966. Located on Naldera Street, it was a government-run institution catering for boys under the care of the state; girls were sent to Seaforth Home.

The Windana Remand Home (1965–1975), a correctional facility for young males, which was situated on Naldera Street, located within the grounds of the Glandore Boys Home.

Description and facilities
Glandore lies south-west of Adelaide, halfway between the beachside suburb of Glenelg and the central business district. It is bordered by Anzac Highway (north), Cross Road (south), South Road (east), and Beckman Street and Winifred Avenue (west). Suburbs surrounding Glandore include Edwardstown, Black Forest, Everard Park, Kurralta Park and Plympton. The Glenelg tram line runs through the middle of the suburb with stations at South Road, Burke Street and Beckman Street. North of the tramline, Glandore is in the City of West Torrens local government area, and south of the tramline, it forms part of the City of Marion.

A number of parks are located within the suburb boundaries, including Glandore Oval, Jubilee Park and the shared grounds of the Glandore Community Centre, Coast FM radio station, and Community Centres SA.

References

Suburbs of Adelaide